Elisa is a feminine given name. It is of Phoenician origin. According to legend, the first queen of Carthage was Elissa (also known as Dido). Another opinion is that it is a shortened form of Elisabeth, a variant of the Biblical name Elizabeth. For other uses, see Elisa (disambiguation).

Closely related names include Elissa, Eliza, Lisa, Elsa, Elisha, and the French form Élise.

People with this name
 Elisa Badenes, Spanish ballet dancer
 Elisa Berroeta, Chilean wood engraver, illustrator
 Élisa Bonaparte (1777–1820), sister of Napoleon
 Elisa Carrillo Cabrera (born 1981), Mexican ballet dancer
 Elisa Christy (born 1917), Mexican actress and dancer
 Elisa Di Francisca (born 1982), Italian fencer
 Elisa Donovan (born 1971), American actress
 Lisvel Elisa Eve (born 1991), Dominican Republic volleyball player
 Elisa Fiorillo (born 1969), American singer
 Elisa Georgiou (born 1994), Greek Cypriot model
 Elisa Iorio (born 2003), Italian artistic gymnast
 Elisa Izquierdo (1989–1995), American female murder victim
 Elisa Jimenez (born 1963), American fashion designer and Project Runway contestant
 Elisa Lam (1991–2013), a Canadian student whose death at the Cecil Hotel attracted wide attention 
 Elisa Lindström, Swedish singer 
 Elisa Kadigia Bove (born 1943), Italian-Somali actress
 Elisa Radziwill (1803–1834), Polish aristocrat
 Elisa Riedo, nanotechnologist
 Elisa Servenius (fl. 1809), Swedish soldier
 Elisa Silva (born 1999), Portuguese singer
 Elisa Siragusa (born 1986), Italian politician
 Elisa Toffoli (born 1977), Italian singer
 Elisa Togut (born 1978), Italian volleyball player
 Elisa Volpatto (born 1986), Brazilian television and film actress
 Elisa Zulueta (born 1984), Chilean television and film actress

Fictional characters
 Elisa Maza in the Disney animated series Gargoyles
 Elisa, a child psychic from Metal Gear Solid: Portable Ops.
 Lucero-Elisa de Riqueza, protagonist of the "Fire and Thorns" trilogy, by Rae Carson.

See also
Elisha
Eliza (given name)
Elisa (disambiguation)

References

Swedish feminine given names 
Spanish feminine given names
Portuguese feminine given names 
Polish feminine given names 
Italian feminine given names
Greek feminine given names
Sammarinese given names